"Just an Illusion" is a song by the British trio Imagination. Co-written by Steve Jolley, Tony Swain, Ashley Ingram and Leee John, the song was a major European hit, peaking at number 2 in the group's native UK. In the United States, "Just an Illusion" went to number 27 on the Black chart. The song also peaked at number 15 on the dance charts.

Track listing
7" Single
"Just an Illusion" – 3:55
"Just an Illusion" (Instrumental) – 3:40

Chart performance

Weekly charts

Year-end charts

Certifications and sales

Sample
"Get Your Number", co-written by Mariah Carey, Jermaine Dupri, Johntá Austin and Bryan-Michael Cox and recorded by Carey for her album The Emancipation of Mimi (2005), samples the song.

See also
List of number-one singles of 1982 (Spain)

References

1982 singles
1982 songs
Imagination (band) songs
Number-one singles in Spain
Songs written by Ashley Ingram
Songs written by Steve Jolley (songwriter)
Songs written by Tony Swain (musician)
Songs written by Leee John
Song recordings produced by Jolley & Swain